Prabhavathi Devi Saraswathi (5 March1905- 14 May 1972) was an Indian Bengali writer and novelist.

Early life
Prabhavathi was born in 1905 in Khantura, Gobardanga, North 24 Parganas district, West Bengal, British India. Her father was Gopalchandra Bandyopadhyay. He was a lawyer based in Dinajpur, East Bengal. She married Bibhutibhushan Chowdhury when she was nine years old. She studied at the Brahma Girls' Training College, where she trained to be a teacher.

Career
Prabhavathi joined the Calcutta City Corporation School as a teacher. She founded the Savitri School in North Kolkata. She wrote in journals as The Mohammadi, Bharatvarsa, Upasana, Banshri, and Sarathi among others. In 1923 she published her first novel, Bijita. Her novel was made into a Bengali movie, Bhanga Gora. It was also made into a 1956 Tamil Language movie called Kula Dheivam and a 1957 Hindi language film called Bhabhi. The play Banglar Meye was based on her book, Pather Shese. She wrote more than 3 hundred books. She created first lady detective named Krishna in Bengali literature. Her notable works include Bratacharini, Byathita Dharitri, Bidhabar Katha, Dhular Dharani, Jagaran, Mahiyasi Nari, and Rabga Bau. She was a director of Jamsedpur All India Bengali Literary Society. In 1946 she was awarded the Leela Award by the University of Calcutta. She was awarded Saraswati by the Navadwip Scholars Society.

Death
Prabhavathi died on 14 May 1972 in Kolkata, West Bengal, India.

References

1905 births
1972 deaths
Bengali Hindus
People from North 24 Parganas district
Bengali writers
Bengali novelists
Indian women novelists
Novelists from West Bengal
Women writers from West Bengal
20th-century Indian novelists
20th-century Indian women writers
Writers from Kolkata